Chahuk (also Romanized as Chāhūk and Chahook; also known as Chāhok, Chauk, and Chok) is a village in Zardeyn Rural District, Nir District, Taft County, Yazd Province, Iran. At the 2006 census, its population was 411, in 124 families.

References 

Populated places in Taft County